James Hartness (September 3, 1861 – February 2, 1934) was an American inventor, mechanical engineer, entrepreneur, amateur astronomer, and politician who served as the 58th governor of Vermont from 1921 to 1923.

Early life and education
Hartness was born in Schenectady, New York, one of three sons. His family moved to Cleveland, Ohio, in 1863 where his father was a foreman in local machine shops and Hartness attended public school.

Career 
Hartness worked up through the ranks in machine shops in Connecticut before moving to Springfield, Vermont. He became one of the nation's first aviators and became a one-term governor of the state of Vermont. He had two daughters, Anna and Helen. His daughter, Helen (Helen Hartness Flanders), was a noted folk song collector who married Ralph Flanders, a U.S. Senator from Vermont
Hartness died in Springfield in 1934. He is buried in the Summer Hill Cemetery in Springfield, not far from his mansion.

He built his Springfield home in 1904, which is an example of shingle style architecture. An inn and restaurant since 1954, it is listed on the National Register of Historic Places for its connection to him.

Engineering and entrepreneurship

At age 16, Hartness began his career in machine shops. At age 21 he became a foreman at the Winsted-Norway Bolt Company in Winsted, Connecticut. He moved in 1886 to Torrington, Connecticut, to work as a tool-maker and foreman at the Union Hardware Company. His lifetime achievement of more than 100 patents began here with patents of locks, roller skates, and bicycle pedal mechanisms.

Hartness had an unpleasant experience at Union Hardware: he had been understandably naive about arranging for royalties on his patents, and the business owners chose not to help rectify the oversight. He did not get to share in the profits derived from the patents. In September 1888, after he had lost several weeks' work to illness, Union Hardware told him not to return.

During the winter of 1888–1889, he worked briefly for several companies: Pratt & Whitney in Hartford, Connecticut; Eaton, Cole and Burnham Co. in Bridgeport, Connecticut, and a plant in Scottdale, Pennsylvania. Roe (1937) surmised that Hartness developed the idea of the flat-turret lathe sometime before this period and sought a suitable machine tool company at which to build it. Only Ambrose Swasey of Warner & Swasey. saw the potential for success of Hartness' idea, reportedly saying "You will hear from that young man again, and from this 'Lazy Susan' of his".

In April 1889 Hartness moved to Springfield, Vermont, to become the superintendent at the struggling Jones and Lamson (J&L) Machine Company. He used his creative energy to revitalize the company. Here he found his chance to manufacture the flat-turret lathe, which increased efficiency and productivity and was especially well adapted to the burgeoning automobile industry. The flat turret lathe improved upon earlier turret lathes via greater rigidity, allowing higher precision, higher speeds and feeds, and longer cuts. Hartness also developed an array of highly advanced tooling to complement the lathe, including improved roller bar feed and die head designs. All of these advantages allowed better parts to be made faster, and thus less expensively, which made the lathe highly desirable to manufacturers. This time, Hartness was prepared to defend his interest in his patent. He arranged with J&L to receive a $100 royalty on each machine.

Hartness changed J&L's business model from making a wide variety of machines to order to specializing in the manufacturing and improving of this one product. With rapid acceptance of this machine tool, orders reached 10 units per day from the manufacturing sector. As a result, Hartness reportedly received up to $1,000 per day in royalties. He also introduced appealing and informative catalogues to market the new Jones and Lamson products. Hartness acquired a large interest in J&L. He became manager in 1896 and president in 1901 until his retirement in 1933.

In 1915 Hartness reluctantly decided to engage in "war business," heeding his brother John's pleas from the London office of J&L. During World War I Hartness, as a representative of American Society of Mechanical Engineers (ASME), became Chairman of the National Screw-Thread Commission, the mission of which was to create international standards for the measurement and sizing of screw threads.

Hartness discouraged modernizing of the Hartness Flat Turret Lathe. Nevertheless, it remained a very successful product until after Hartness's retirement, when a new J&L turret lathe model by John Lovely finally replaced it.

The 1921 edition of the ASME mechanical catalog and directory showed that J&L offered several models of Hartness flat turret lathe, an automatic chucking lathe, an automatic die, a screw-thread comparator, and the Fay automatic lathe. J&L had offices in Springfield, Vermont, San Francisco, California, and London, England, plus agents in five other countries.

In 1929, Hartness and Russell W. Porter patented an optical comparator, a device that applies the principles of optics to the inspection of manufactured parts by projecting the magnified silhouette of a part onto a screen where its dimensions and geometry of the part are measured against prescribed limits. Traditionally, mechanics used a mechanical gauge to assess whether screws were to specifications. Hartness employed his knowledge of optics and magnification to devise a much more practical optical method for measurement. This contribution stemmed from Hartness' work as the Chairman of the U.S. National Screw-Thread Commission and from his familiarity with optics in astronomy and telescope-building. The Hartness Screw-Thread Comparator was for many years a profitable product for J&L. The optical comparator remains a standard means inspection of many kinds of parts.

Mentor of machine tool entrepreneurs
Hartness encouraged talented inventors in his employ at J&L to strike out on their own as entrepreneurs. These included three Springfield companies and one Windsor, Vermont company:
 Edwin R. Fellows, founder of the Fellows Gear Shaper Company
 William L. Bryant, founder of the Bryant Chucking Grinder Company
 Fred P. Lovejoy, founder of the Lovejoy Tool Company
 George O. Gridley, founder of the National Acme Company

The companies started by these men helped make Springfield and Windsor a prosperous manufacturing region, thanks not to its access to raw materials or markets, but due to a pool of talented engineers and machinists. Joseph Roe ranked Hartness in the class of Henry Maudslay and Elisha K. Root for his mentorship of a younger generation of machine tool builders.

Management

His son-in-law, Ralph Flanders, reported that Hartness examined "some of the elements which go into making workmen both contented and productive" in his book The Human Factor in Works Management. His Hartness Turret Lathe Manual starts with the statement, "Since the machine is only an implement, it cannot be considered a thing entirely apart from the man. In fact, the man is the greater part. The personal welfare of the operator must be considered. This is something more than the man's relation to the machine. It includes an equally important phase—his relationship to other men and to his environment in general."

In a sense Hartness was responding to the era's enthusiastic fervor for scientific management, which Hartness and many others felt did not adequately address the psychology of how to manage employees as human beings and maintain their respect.

Affiliations, degrees and medals

Hartness was an active member of the following engineering, scientific, and arts societies:
American Society of Mechanical Engineers, which elected him president in Fall 1913 to serve the 1914–1915 term
 American Engineering Council (formerly the Federated American Engineering Societies), which elected him president in 1924 to serve the following two-year term
 Society of Automotive Engineers
 British Institution of Mechanical Engineers
 American Association for the Advancement of Science (Fellow)
 British Royal Aeronautical Society (Fellow)
 American Astronomical Society (Member)
 British Royal Astronomical Society (Member)
 British Royal Society for the Encouragement of Arts (Member)
 Aero Club of America
 Aero Club of Vermont
His life achievements were recognized with honorary degrees from the University of Vermont (ME in 1910 and LLD in 1920) and Yale University (MA in 1914). The Franklin Institute awarded Hartness the Edward Longstreth Medal in 1921, recognizing his invention of the Hartness screw thread comparator. In the same year the American Philosophical Society and the City Trusts of Philadelphia awarded the John Scott Medal to Hartness for the flat turret lathe, citing its usefulness in making artillery.

Aviation 
Hartness first flew in Germany in 1913 in a hydrogen-filled airship, designed by Ferdinand von Zeppelin. In 1914, Hartness learned to fly a  Wright Flyer near Garden City, New York. Hartness then obtained his pilot's license from the Aero Club of America. He encouraged, and served as president of, the Vermont Aero Club. He donated the land for the Springfield Aerodrome to the state, establishing the first airfield in Vermont—Hartness State Airport.

After his trans-Atlantic flight, Charles Lindbergh toured the United States in the Spirit of St. Louis to promote aviation. He landed in Springfield on July 26, 1927 in his visit to Vermont and spoke at a large gathering at the airport. Hartness hosted Lindbergh at his home.

Astronomy

Hartness's interest in optics and astronomy led to his development of a telescope mount with the revolving dome on an equatorial plane. An additional feature of this telescope, which still stands at the former Hartness Mansion, was that the optics of the telescope passed through a lens in the wall of the dome. This allowed the observer to stay warm in winter. (Conventional telescopes were often contained within domes that opened an aperture for the telescope to gain exposure both to the sky and the ambient air.) The success of this patent led to more telescope activities and commissions. With Hartness's encouragement and financial support, Russell W. Porter initiated the Springfield Telescope Makers Club. The club still celebrates their annual Stellafane gathering in Springfield.

Governor of Vermont
Hartness was a one-term governor of Vermont, elected in 1920 and serving from 1921 to 1923. He campaigned on the issue of enticing Vermonters to stay in state rather than seek employment elsewhere. He also promised an improved transportation system and more manufacturing to supplement the traditional agricultural economy. He won the election by a wider margin in the state than Warren Harding, who carried Vermont in the presidential race that year.

References

Bibliography

Books by Hartness

 Republished by Hive Publishing Company as Hive management history series no. 46, 

 Republished by Kessinger Publishing, 2004, as

Biography

Other cited sources

Further reading

, pp. 197–200.

External links

 
 

1861 births
1934 deaths
American astronomers
19th-century American inventors
20th-century American inventors
Aviators from New York (state)
Fellows of the Royal Aeronautical Society
Republican Party governors of Vermont
Machine tool builders
Presidents of the American Society of Mechanical Engineers
Politicians from Schenectady, New York
People from Springfield, Vermont
Engineers from New York (state)
Scientists from New York (state)